Andorra participated in the 2002 Winter Paralympic Games in Salt Lake City, United States from 7 to 16 March 2002. It was the country's first participation in the Paralympic Games.

Competitors
The following is the list of number of competitors who participated at the Games per sport/discipline.

Alpine Skiing

Andorra qualified two skiers in both the men's giant slalom and the men's slalom LW10 class.

See also
Andorra at the Paralympics
Andorra at the 2002 Winter Olympics

References

External links
International Paralympic Committee

2002
Nations at the 2002 Winter Paralympics
Winter Paralympics